
Gmina Piaski is an urban-rural gmina (administrative district) in Świdnik County, Lublin Voivodeship, in eastern Poland.

Villages
Apart from the town of Piaski, Gmina Piaski contains the villages and settlements of Borkowszczyzna, Brzezice, Brzezice Pierwsze, Brzeziczki, Bystrzejowice A, Bystrzejowice B, Bystrzejowice Pierwsze, Emilianów, Gardzienice Drugie, Gardzienice Pierwsze, Giełczew, Jadwisin, Janówek, Józefów, Kawęczyn, Kębłów, Klimusin, Kolonia Kębłów, Kolonia Siedliszczki, Kolonia Wola Piasecka, Kozice Dolne, Kozice Dolne-Kolonia, Kozice Górne, Majdan Brzezicki, Majdan Kawęczyński, Majdan Kozic Dolnych, Majdan Kozic Górnych, Majdanek Kozicki, Marysin, Młodziejów, Nowiny, Piaski Górne, Siedliszczki, Stefanówka, Wierzchowiska Drugie, Wierzchowiska Pierwsze, Wola Gardzienicka, Wola Piasecka and Żegotów.

Neighbouring gminas
Gmina Piaski is bordered by the gminas of Fajsławice, Głusk, Jabłonna, Krzczonów, Mełgiew, Milejów, Rybczewice and Trawniki.

References

Polish official population figures 2006

Piaski
Gmina Piaski